ABC Country is a digital radio station, available on mobile devices, DAB+ digital radio, digital TV and online. A small number of self-help retransmissions, mainly in West Australia and Queensland also carry the station's programme stream. It is owned and operated by the Australian Broadcasting Corporation.

History
ABC Country broadcasts Australian country music (about 70% Australian content including about 5% Indigenous Australians country). Also broadcasts Early Morning Country and Saturday Night Country which is also broadcast on ABC Local Radio.

Australian radio networks
Australian Broadcasting Corporation radio stations
Country radio stations in Australia
Public radio in Australia